Ptichodis surrufula is a moth of the family Erebidae. It is found in San Luis Potosí, Mexico.

References

Moths described in 1913
Ptichodis